Air Intelligence of the Russian Air Force is a branch of Russian air force responsible for creating an intelligence picture for Air Force missions and participating in creating an overall intelligence picture. Russian aerial reconnaissance is one of the oldest in the world and began to operate back in 1911. Includes a number of reconnaissance and research units on various topics related to air warfare and collaborates with the Military Intelligence Directorate.

History 
Aerial reconnaissance or the Air intelligence in Russia was created in 1911 as part of the Imperial air force. Since 1912 to 1913 год, during First Balkan War,  Russian air units under the command of Captain Shchetinin, together with Bulgaria, carried out aerial reconnaissance tasks using photographs of the fortresses using air intelligence.

During the First World War the Air reconnaissance began to operate as an independent air force unit.

After the creation of the USSR and at the Great Patriotic War 12% of the Soviet airplanes were carried out intelligence missions. With the escalation of hostilities, the intensity of air patrols also increased. In 1941, the number of patrol aircraft was 9,2%, in 1944 — 15%. Aerial intelligence not only collected data on the enemy, but also supplemented and documented data on other types of reconnaissance for the Red Army. Aerial intelligence was often the only means of obtaining information on the enemy for the military command. Air intelligence during the war was carried out in two ways: visual observation and aerial photography.  Moreover, if in 1941 aerial photography accounted for a little more than 10% of all reconnaissance missions, then in 1945 it was exceeded 86%.  The weak link of the domestic reconnaissance aviation was the absence during the war years of a specialized reconnaissance aircraft.

At the Cold War era it was carried out as part of the Soviet Air Force.

After the dissolution of the Soviet Union  the aerial reconnaissance service cooperated with The electronic warfare forces and jointly controlled the Russian UAV.

Literature
 Советская военная энциклопедия. / ред. Н. В. Огарков. М., Воениздат, 1976 год;
 Воздушная разведка железных дорог. М., 1963;
 Лазарев Б. А., Сизов А. II. Фотографические средства воздушной разведки. Ч. 1. Рига, 1973;
 Маковский В. П. Системы обработки и передачи разведпнформации. Ч. 1. Рига, 1973; Соколов А. Н.
 Hовиков А., Юнусов Т. Визуальный поиск наземных целей в сумерках.— «Авиация и космонавтика», 1965, No. 12;
 Разведчик над полем боя.— «Авиация и космонавтика», 1965, No. 9.

See also 
 Intelligence Directorate of the Main Staff of the Russian Navy
 GRU

References

External links 
 Air Intelligence on Russian Ministry of Defense Website
 Воздушная разведка - аргументы против заблуждений, Russian article
 Air Intelligence on airforce.ru

Military units and formations established in 1911
Russian Air Force
Aerial reconnaissance